

Emergency Services

More Info

4 Digit Short Codes 
Short Codes in 19XX Range for Government Organizations
  
Short Codes in 13XX Range for Private Sector Organizations

Operator Hotlines

Fixed line (landline) codes
Fixed Telephone numbers in Sri Lanka consist of 10-digits in the xxx y zzzzzz format where:

Area codes

Operator Codes for Fixed LTE/Fibre/Copper/CDMA

Mobile operator codes

Mobile numbers in Sri Lanka consist of 10-digits in the xxx zzzzzzz format where: 

 "xxx" represents the mobile operator code when contacting a mobile number. All mobile operator codes begin with 07. 
 "zzzzzzz" represents the main telephone number of seven digits.

Dialling into Sri Lanka

To Fixed telephone ☎
To dial into Sri Lanka from abroad callers must use the +94 xx y zzzzzz format where:

To Mobile phone 📱
To dial into Sri Lanka from abroad callers must use the +94 xx zzzzzz format where:

See also
 Telecommunications in Sri Lanka
 ISO 3166-2:LK
 Postal codes in Sri Lanka
 Subdivisions of Sri Lanka
Registered Public Pay Phone Services

References

External links
SLT-MOBITEL
Lanka Bell
Dialog
Hutch
Airtel
ITU allocations list
Registered Public Pay Phone Services

Sri Lanka
Telephone numbers
Telecommunications in Sri Lanka